The Beaulieu Monorail is England's first monorail, linking the National Motor Museum to the Beaulieu Palace House. the monorail line passes through the main museum building, allowing passengers to see the automobile collection from above. Originally installed at a Butlins Holiday Camp, the monorail was moved to its present location in 1974. The cars were originally of a streamliner design, but were modified to allow for more passenger space.

References

External links 

 Flickr

Monorails
Railway lines opened in 1974
Monorails in the United Kingdom
Tourist attractions in Hampshire